This is a list of compositions for cello and piano. It includes sonatas as well as other short pieces for cello and piano.

Granados, Enrique: Madrigal for Cello and Piano

A
Carl Friedrich Abel
Several sonatas
Thomas Adès
Lieux retrouvés (2009)
Vasif Adigozalov
Sonatina for Cello and Piano (1957)
Sonata for Cello (1987)
Miguel del Águila
Silence
Kalevi Aho
Sonata for Cello and Piano (2019)
Franco Alfano
Sonata for Cello and Piano (1925)
Charles-Valentin Alkan
Cello sonata "Sonate de concert", Op. 47 in E (1857)
 Anatoly Alexandrov
Andante Pathetico for cello and piano opus 17 (1915–1921)
Cello Sonata in G major, Op. 112 (1981–1982)
Franghiz Ali-Zadeh
 Habil-Sayagy In Habil's Style for cello and piano
 Fikret Amirov
 Elegy for cello and piano (1948)
 Poem-Monologue for cello and piano (1948)
Gilbert Amy
Mémoire (1989)
Louis Andriessen
Welk interval vind je het mooist (2012)
Elegy (1957)
Tanya Anisimova
Icelandic Ballad (2007)
Mexico-Mexico (2005)
Boris Arapov
Sonata for cello and piano (1985)
Anton Arensky
Two Pieces, Op. 12, for cello and piano (Little Ballade, Capriccioso Dance)
Four Pieces, Op. 56, for cello and piano (Oriental Melody, Romance, Chant Triste, Humoresque)
Alexander Arutiunian
Impromptu (1941)
Poem
 Valery Arzoumanov
 Six Waltzes for cello and piano opus 170A
Benjamin Attahir
Apres l'ineffable (2018)
Kurt Atterberg
Cello sonata, Op. 27 in B minor (1925; written to be played by any of several instruments)
 Lera Auerbach
 Twenty-Four Preludes for cello and piano opus 47 (1999)
 Suite for cello and piano opus 47A (1999)
 Sonata No. 1 for cello and piano opus 69 (2002) (Dedicated to David Finckel and Wu Han)
Georges Auric
Imaginées 2 (1970)
Vaja Azarashvili
Cello Sonata No. 1 (1961-99)
Cello Sonata No. 2 (1976)
Five Preludes (2006)

B
Milton Babbitt
Dual for cello and piano (1980)
Henk Badings
Cello Sonata No. 1(1929)
Cello Sonata No. 2 (1934)
David N. Baker
Sonata for Violoncello and Piano (1973) (Commissioned by Janos Starker)
Granville Bantock
Cello Sonata No. 1 in B minor (1940s)
Cello Sonata No. 2 in F-sharp minor (1940s)
Samuel Barber
Cello sonata, Op. 6 in C minor (1932)
Béla Bartók
Rhapsody 1
 Sonatina for cello and piano originally for piano (1915) (arr. Varga)
Rami Bar-Niv
Improvisation for cello solo (5 min) (1997)
Improvisation for cello and piano (11 min) (2001)
Longing for my Father – 7 songs without words for cello and piano (26 min) (2002)
Blue-Rag for cello and piano (5 min) (1998)
Blue-Rag for 2 cellos (or cello and violin/viola/flute/clarinet/trumpet/oboe/saxophone) and piano (5 min) (1998)
Shmateh-Rag for cello and piano (5 min) (2004)
Vocalise on Prelude #1 by Bach, for cello and piano (5 min) (1998)
Arnold Bax
Folk-Tale (1918)
Cello Sonata in E-flat (1923)
Cello Sonatina in D (1933)
Legend-Sonata in F-sharp minor (1943)
Sally Beamish
Iasg (1993)
Gala Water (1994)
Bridging the Day (1998)
Sonata (2000)
Ludwig van Beethoven
Cello sonata, Op. 5, No. 1 in F major (1796)
Cello sonata, Op. 5, No. 2 in G minor (1796)
Cello sonata, Op. 69 in A (1808)
Cello sonata, Op. 102, No. 1 in C (1815)
Cello sonata, Op. 102, No. 2 in D (1815)
Sonata Op. 17 in F (transcription of the Sonata for Horn and piano)
Sonata Op. 64 in E flat (transcription of String Trio Op.3)
Twelve Variations for cello & piano in F major on Mozart's "Ein Mädchen oder Weibchen," Op. 66 (1796)
Twelve Variations for cello & piano in G major on Handel's "See, the Conqu'ring Hero comes," WoO 45
Seven Variations for cello & piano in E flat major on Mozart's "Bei Männern," WoO 46
Karol Beffa
"Marmor" for cello and piano
Richard Rodney Bennett
Sonata for Cello and Piano (1991)
William Sterndale Bennett
Cello Sonata Op. 32 (1852)
Erik Bergman
Quo Vadis Op.102
Michael Berkeley
Etude des fleurs (1979)
At A Solemn Wake (2015)
Oscar Bianchi
Soffio (2013)
Adolphe Biarent
Cello sonata in F-sharp minor (1915)
Harrison Birtwistle
Lied (7 min) (2006)
Bogenstrich (2006-2009)
 Felix Blumenfeld
 Two Morceaux for cello and piano, opus 19 (1894)
Luigi Boccherini
19 sonatas for cello and bass, two sonatas for two cellos
Léon Boëllmann
Suite, Op. 6 (1890)
Variations Symphoniques, Op. 23 (1893)
Suite Gothiques, Op. 25 (1895)
Deux morceaux, Op. 31 (1896)
Cello Sonata, Op. 40 (1897)
Pièce ILB 19
Corentin Boissier
Cello Sonata, Op. 21 (2017)
William Bolcom
Decalage (1969)
Capriccio (1985)
Sonata for Violoncello and Piano (1989)
Antonio Maria Bononcini
12 sonatas, a sonata da camera and a sinfonia for cello and figured bass
Lili Boulanger
D’un soir triste
Nadia Boulanger
3 Pièces pour violoncelle et piano
Nimrod Borenstein
The Magic Mountain opus 30 (2003)
Heroic Elegy opus 67 (2014)
Odysseus opus 87 (2019)
Alexander Borodin
Cello sonata in B minor (1860)
Sergei Bortkiewicz
Three Pieces for Cello and Piano, Op. 25 (1922)
Cello Sonata, Op. 36 (1924)
Henriëtte Bosmans
Cello Sonata (1919)
Three Impressions (Cortège, Nuit calme, En Espagne) (1926)
Johannes Brahms
Cello sonata, Op. 38 in E minor (1862–65)
Cello sonata, Op. 99 in F (1886)
Violin sonata No 1 in G major Rain, Op. 78 (1878–79) transcribed by Paul Klengel
Violin Sonata in A, Op. 100 (transcribed for cello by Varga)
Violin Sonata in d minor, Op. 108 (transcribed for cello by Varga)
Brahms-Piatti: Twenty-One Hungarian Dances (1881)
Frank Bridge
Two Short Pieces(1912)
Cello Sonata in D minor (1913–17)
Jean-Baptiste Bréval
Cello Sonata in C Major
Benjamin Britten
Cello sonata, Op. 65 in C (1960–61)
Earle Brown
Music for Cello and Piano (1955)
Special Events (1998-99)
James Francis Brown
Prospero's Isle (2006). Also symphonic poem version
Max Bruch
Kol Nidrei, Op. 47 (1881)
Canzone, Op. 55 (1891)
Adagio nach Keltischen melodien, Op. 56 (1891)
Ave Maria, Op. 61 (1892)
Vier Stücke, Op. 70 (1897) :de:Vier Stücke, Op. 70 (Bruch)
Gavin Bryars
The South Downs (1995)
The North Shore (1995)
Lauda (con sordino) (2002)
Ferruccio Busoni
Märchen BV 123 (1879)
Serenata Op. 34 BV 196 (1883)
Kleine Suite Op. 23, for cello and piano, BV 215 (1886)
Kultaselle, ten variations for cello and piano BV 237 (1889)
Sylvano Bussotti
Gran Duo (1977-1978)

C
Joseph Callaerts
Andante Sostenuto Op.16
Regis Campo
Deux mouvements (2004)
David Carlson
Sonata for Cello and Piano (1991) (Carl Fischer Music)
Elliott Carter
Elegy
Cello Sonata (1948)
John Casken
Stolen Airs (2015)
Alfredo Casella
Cello Sonata No. 1 (1906)
Cello Sonata No. 2 (1926)
Notturno (1934)
Tarantella (1934)
Gaspar Cassadó
Toccata "After Frescobaldi" 1925
Minuetto "After Paderewski"
Allegretto Grazioso "After Schubert"
Rapsodia del Sur
Pastorale "After Couperin"
La Pendule, la Fileuse et le Galant 1925
Serenade 1925
Sonata in A minor 1925
Sonata nello stile antico spagnuolo (Sonata in an "Old Spanish Style") 1925
Danse du diable vert (Dance of the Green Devil) for violin or cello 1926
Lamento de Boabdil 1931
Requiebros 1934
Partita 1935
Archares 1954
Morgenlied 1957
Mario Castelnuovo-Tedesco
I Nottambuli. Variazioni Fantastiche for cello and piano, Op. 47
Sonata per violoncello e pianoforte, Op. 50 (1928)
Chant Hébraique: Vocalise, Op. 53 (1928), arranged for cello and piano (1930)
Toccata op. 83, per violoncello e pianoforte (1935)
Meditation 'Kol Nidre' for cello and piano (1941)
"Figaro," from The Barber of Seville by Rossini (1943) for violoncello and piano
"Don Giovanni" (Serenade), from Don Giovanni by Mozart (1943) for violoncello and piano
"La Vallée des Cloches" from "Miroirs" by Ravel, a concert transcription for cello and piano (1944)
"Alborada del Gracioso," from "Miroirs" by Ravel, a concert transcription for cello and piano (1944)
Raphaël Cendo
Furia (2009-2010)
Friedrich Cerha
Fünf Sätze (2013)
Jordi Cervelló (1935–?)
Sonata In Memorian Pau Casals for cello and piano (10 min) (1976)
Un Cant a Pau Casals for cello and piano (1991)
George Chadwick
Romanza (1883)
Easter Morn (1914)
Cécile Chaminade
Romanza for cello and piano Op. 31a (unpublished)
La Chaise à Porteurs for cello and piano Op. 55b (Enoch) 1896
 Sommeil d'Enfant for cello and piano )p. 125 (Enoch) 1907
Daniel Chazanoff
Leaves of a Hebrew Calendar for Cello and Piano (Allentoff Music)
Frédéric Chopin
Introduction et polonaise brillante, Op.3
Cello sonata, Op. 65 in G minor (1845)
Grand Duo concertant, E major, B. 70 (1832) (together with Auguste Franchomme)
Francesco Cilea
Cello sonata, Op. 38 in D (1888)
Rebecca Clarke
Sonata (1919)
Epilogue (1921)
Rhapsody for Cello and Piano (1923)
Samuel Coleridge-Taylor
Variations for Cello and Piano
Jérôme Combier
Freezing Fields (2017) for Cello and Piano
David Conte
Sonata for Violoncello and Piano (2015) (written for cellist Emil Miland)
Aaron Copland
Waltz and Celebration
John Corigliano
Phantasmagoria (1993)
Henry Cowell
Cello sonata
Hymn and Fuguing Tune No. 9 for cello & piano, HC 758
Four declamations with return (1949)
Jean Cras
"La Chair", Cello Sonata (1901)
Largo (1903)
Légende (1930)
César Cui
Scherzando, Op. 36 No. 1 (1886)
Cantabile, Op. 36 No. 2 (1886)
Barcarolle, Op. 81 (1910)

D
Peter Maxwell Davies
Sonata for ‘Cello & Piano (2007) "Sequentia Serpentigena"
Gualtiero Dazzi
Petite suite de voyage (1997)
Claude Debussy
Intermezzo
Scherzo
Cello Sonata (1915)
Frederick Delius
Cello sonata (1916) 
Norman Dello Joio
 Duo Concertato (1949)
 Edison Denisov
 Suite for cello and piano (1961)
 Three Pieces for cello and piano, Op. 26 (1967)
 Sonata for cello and piano, Op. 40 (1971)
 Variations on a Theme of Schubert for cello and piano (1986)
Ernő Dohnányi
Cello Sonata in B-flat minor, Op. 8 (1899)
Franco Donatoni
Sincronie
Felix Draeseke
Cello sonata, Op. 51 in D (1890) 
Marcel Dupré
Sonata for Cello and Organ A minor (1964)
Pascal Dusapin
Slackline for Cello and Piano (2015)
Antonín Dvořák
Polonaise in A major, B.94 (1879)
Rondo in G minor, Op. 94, B.171 (1891)
Slavonic Dances, Op. 46, B.172 (1891)
No.3 in A major, Polka : Allegretto
No.8 in G minor, Furiant : Vivace
Silent Woods, Op. 68.5, B.173 (1891)

E
Moritz Eggert
Fast Forward (for Cello and Piano, 1999)
Continuum (for Cello and Piano, 2000)
La Risposta (2002)
Brian Elias
L’innominata (2018)
Jose Elizondo
Danzas Latinoamericanas (Latin American Dances) (1997)
Otoño en Buenos Aires (Autumn in Buenos Aires) (1997)
Pan de Azúcar (Sugar Loaf mountain) (1997)
Atardecer Tapatío (Sunset in Guadalajara) (1997)
La alborada de la esperanza (The Dawn of Hope) (2018)
Limoncello (2018)
Crepúsculos (Twilights) (2018)
Princesa de hadas (Fairy Tale Princess) (1995)
George Enescu
 Nocturne et Saltarello
Cello sonata, Op. 26, No. 1 in F minor (1898)
Cello sonata, Op. 26, No. 2 in C major (1935)
Einar Englund
Cello sonata (1982)
 Iván Erőd
 "Köszönet Bartóknak" (Thanks to Bartók) Op.81 (2006) (3 min)
Thierry Escaich
Nocturne (1997)
 Andrei Yakovlevich Eshpai
 Sonata for cello and piano (1990) (25 min)

F
Sebastian Fagerlund
Silent Words, (2013)
Ferenc Farkas
Alla danza ungherese No. 2 (1934)
Sonata (1932)
Folksong Sonatina (1955)
All’antica (1962)
Ballada (1963)
Quattro pezzi (1965)
Louise Farrenc
Cello sonata, Op. 46 in B-flat (published 1861)
Gabriel Fauré
Petite Pièce in G major op. 49 (LOST) (1888)
Élégie, Op. 24 (1883)
Romance in A major, Op. 69 (1894)
Papillon, Op. 77 (1894)
Sicilienne, Op. 78 (1898)
Sérénade, Op. 98 (1908)
Cello Sonata No. 1 Op. 109 in D minor (1917)
Cello Sonata No. 2 Op. 117 in G minor (1921)
Jindřich Feld
Three pieces for cello and piano (1954–55)
Sonata for cello and piano (1972)
Richard Festinger
Sonata for Cello and Piano (1990)
Vivian Fine
Fantasy for cello and piano (1962)
Sonata for cello and piano (1982)
Michael Finnissy
Chi Mei Ricercari (2015)
Alissa Firsova
Fantasy Op.29
Elena Firsova
Sonata Op.5
You and I Op.55
The Enchanted Island Op.66
Homage to Canisy, Op.129
Lukas Foss
Intermezzo for cello and piano (1940)
Duo (Fantasia) for cello and piano (1941)
Capriccio for cello and piano (1948)
John Foulds
Cello Sonata, Op. 6 (around 1905, revised 1927)
Jean Françaix
Sérénade (1934)
Mouvement perpétuel (1944)
Nocturne (1951)
Berceuse (1953)
Rondino staccato (1953)
Fantaisie (1962)
 César Franck
 Violin Sonata in A major, arranged for cello and piano by Jules Delsart and approved by the composer
Eduard Franck
Cello Sonate, No.1 in D major, Op. 6 (1846)
Cello Sonata, No.2 in F major, Op. 42 (1882)
Richard Franck
Cello Sonata, No.1 in D major, Op. 22 (1894)
Cello Sonata, No.2 in E flat major, Op. 36 (1903)
Serenade for cello in C major, Op. 24 (1896)
Peter Fribbins
Sonata for 'Cello and Piano (2004 - 2005)
"...that which echoes in eternity" (2002 - 2003). Also version for violin and piano
Joel Phillip Friedman
Pas de Deux (1994, Rev. 2001)
Robert Fuchs
Cello sonata, Op. 29 in D minor
Cello sonata, Op. 83 in E-flat minor
7 fantasieën Op. 78
Dai Fujikura
Distorting rage (2000)
Flicker (2011)

G
Domenico Gabrielli
 Two sonatas for cello and basso continuo
Zoltán Gárdonyi
Sonata for cello and piano (1944) 
 Valeri Gavrilin
 Kholeovliya for cello and piano (2003)
Jiří Gemrot
Sonata for cello and piano (published 2003 by Český rozhlas
Roberto Gerhard
Cello Sonata (1956 originally for viola and piano (1948), transcription by the composer for cello and piano)
Friedrich Gernsheim
Cello Sonata No. 1 Op. 12 in D minor
Cello Sonata No. 2  Op. 79 in E minor
Cello Sonata No. 3 Op. 87 in E minor
Alberto Ginastera
Cello Sonata Op. 49 (1979)
Pampeana No. 2 for cello and piano, op. 21
Detlev Glanert
Serenade Op.13 (1986)
 Alexander Glazunov
 Arabic Melody for cello and piano, Op. 4 No. 5; from Five Romances (songs) (1882–85)
 Elegy in D flat major for cello and piano (Une Pensee a F. Liszt), Op. 17 (1888)
 Two Pieces for cello and piano, Op. 20A (1888) (Melodie; Spanish Serenade)
 Chant du Ménestrel for cello and piano, Op. 71 (1900)
Reinhold Glière
Ballade
12 Album Leaves for cello and piano, Op. 51 (1910)
Vladimír Godár
Sonata in memory of Viktor Shklovsky for cello and piano (1985)
Emmeleia for cello and piano (1994)
Alexander Goehr
Sonata (1984)
Fantasie (2005)
Karl Goldmark
Cello sonata, Op. 39 in F (1890)
Paul Graener
Suite, Op. 66 (1924)
Percy Grainger
The Maiden and the Frog
The Sussex Mummers’ Christmas Carol
Olivier Greif
Deux Pièces pour violoncelle et piano - 1
Deux Pièces pour violoncelle et piano - 2
En rêve pour violoncelle et piano
Oi Akashe pour violoncelle et piano
Shylock funèbre pour piano et violoncelle
Sonate de Requiem pour violoncelle et piano
Sonate de Requiem pour violoncelle et piano
Veni Creator pour violoncelle et piano
Mark Gresham
 Sonata for Violoncello and Piano (1993)
Edvard Grieg
Cello sonata, Op. 36 in A minor (1883)
Jorge Grundman
Sonata for Cello and Piano. Those Who Couldn't Wave Goodbye (2020)
Friedrich Grützmacher (1832–1903)
Hungarian Fantasy for Violoncello and Piano, Op. 7

H
Kimmo Hakola
Consolation (2004)
Appassionato Op. 76 (2009)
Ernesto Halffter
Fantasie Espagnole (1952)
Lou Harrison
Suite pour violoncelle et piano (1995)
Jonathan Harvey
Dialogue and Song (1977)
Paavo Heininen
Deux Chansons
Swan Hennessy
Rapsodie gaélique, Op. 63 (1925), Paris: Max Eschig & Cie.
Pièce celtique, Op. 74 (1928), Paris: Éditions Max Eschig
Sonatine, Op. 81 (1929), Paris: Propriété de l'auteur
Heinrich von Herzogenberg
Cello Sonata, No.1 in a minor, Op. 52 (1886)
Cello Sonata, No.2, Op. 64 (1889)
Cello Sonata, No.3, Op. 94 (1895)
Kenneth Hesketh
|Cantilena
Kurt Hessenberg
Sonata, Op. 23 (1941)
Jennifer Higdon
Nocturne
John S. Hilliard
Cello sonata
Paul Hindemith
 3 pieces Op.8 (1917)
Sonata Op. 11, No. 3 (1919)
Drei leichte Stücke for Cello and Piano (1938)
Variations on "A Frog He Went a Courting" for Cello and Piano (1941) 
Kleine Sonata (1942)
Sonata (1948)
Alistair Hinton
Cello sonata, Op. 39 (1999)
Heinz Holliger
Romancendres (2003)
York Höller
Pas de deux (1993)
Arthur Honegger
Cello sonata, H32 (à René Gosselin) (1920)
Sonatina (1921)
Toshio Hosokawa
Lied III
Hans Huber
Cello Sonata, No.1 in D major, Op. 33 (1878)
Cello Sonata, No.2 "Pastoral Sonate" in A major, Op. 84
Suite in d minor, Op. 89 (1886)
Cello Sonata, No.3 in C-sharp minor, Op. 114 (1900)
Cello Sonata, No.4
Romance for Cello and Piano
Klaus Huber
Lazarus I/II (1978)
Bertold Hummel
Sonata in F, Op. 2 (1950)
Sonata brevis, Op. 11a (1955)
Little Suite, Op. 19a (1956)
Sonatina N°1, Op. 35c (1969)
Sonatina N°2, Op. 52a (1973)
Johann Nepomuk Hummel
Cello sonata, Op. 104 in A (1824)
Jean Huré
Sonata No. 1 in F♯ minor for cello and piano (1903; Paris: A. Z. Mathot, 1914)
Sonata No. 2 in F major for cello and piano (1906)
Sonata No. 3 in F♯ major for cello and piano (1909)
William Hurlstone
Cello sonata in D
Eero Hämeenniemi
 Cello Concerto (2011)

I
Vincent d'Indy
Cello sonata, Op. 84 in D (1924–25)
John Ireland
Cello sonata in G minor (1923)
Yoshirō Irino
Sonata for Cello and Piano (1945)
Yuri Ishchenko
Adagietto and Scherzino for cello and piano

J
Marie Jaëll
Cello Sonata in A minor (1881, rev. 1886)
Leoš Janáček
Pohádka or Fairy Tale (1910, rev. 1923)
Presto
Daan Janssens
Wie aus der Ferne, for cello & piano (2022)
Betsy Jolas
Quatre pièces en marge (1983)
Femme le soir (2018) for Cello and Piano
André Jolivet 
Nocturne (1943)
Joseph Jongen
Cello sonata, Op. 39 (1912)
Paul Juon
Cello sonata, Op. 54 in A minor (1913)

K
Dmitri Kabalevsky
Cello sonata, Op. 71 in B-flat (1962)
Robert Kahn
Cello Sonata, Op. 37 in F
Jouni Kaipainen
Trois morceaux de l'aube (1980)
Elegia (1983)
Vitezslava Kapralova
Deux ritournelles pour violoncelle et piano, Op. 25 (1940)
Nikolai Kapustin
Sonata No. 1, Op. 63
Sonata No. 2, Op. 84
Elegy, Op. 96
Burlesque, Op. 97
Nearly Waltz, Op. 98
Louis Karchin
Sonata for Violoncello and Piano (1990)
Minna Keal
Ballade in F minor (1929)
Karen Khachaturian
Sonata for cello and piano
Tikhon Khrennikov
Cello sonata, Op. 34 (1989)
Friedrich Kiel
Cello sonata in A minor, Op. 52 (1868)
Zoltán Kodály
Cello sonata, Op. 4 (1909–10)
Dances of Galanta for cello and piano (arr. Varga)
Three chorale preludes on
 "Ach was ist doch unser Leben"
 "Vater unser im Himmelreich"
 "Christus der uns selig macht"
Prelude and fugue for cello and piano (Bach, tr. Kodály)
Sonatina for cello and piano
Adagio for cello and piano
Hungarian rondo for cello and piano
Charles Koechlin
Cello sonata, Op. 66 (1917) 
Chansons bretonnes Op.115
Ernst Krenek
Phantasiestück Op. 135 (1953)
Hans Kronold
Five Pieces for Cello and Piano, Op. 57
Five Pieces for Cello and Piano, Op. 58
Pablo Kunik
"Bruma" Opus 9 for Cello and Piano (2022)
Larysa Kuzmenko
Sonata for Cello and Piano, “A Dream Within A Dream” (1992)

L
László Lajtha
Cello sonata
Édouard Lalo
Cello sonata in A minor (to Anton Rubinstein), 1856
Allegro in E-flat, Op. 16 (to Léon Jacquard)
David Lang
undanceable (2010)
Salvatore Lanzetti
More than 24 cello sonatas with basso continuo
Thomas Larcher
Mumien (2002)
”Splinters” Sonata (2012)
Vadim Larchikov
Sonata for cello and piano (1992)
Mario Lavista
Quotations
Tres danzas seculares
Ramon Lazkano
Wintersonnenwende-2 (2007)
Kenneth Leighton
Elegy for 'cello and piano, Op. 5 (1950)
Partita for 'cello and piano, Op. 35 (1959)
Alleluia Pascha Nostrum for 'cello and piano, Op. 85 (1981)
Guillaume Lekeu
Cello sonata in F (finished by Vincent d'Indy)
Ruggero Leoncavallo
Serenade
Fred Lerdahl
Duo (2017)
Peter Lieberson
Three Variations
Remembering Schumann
Hélène Liebmann
Grande Sonate Op.11 (1813)
Magnus Lindberg
Moto (1990)
Dos Coyotes (2002)
Santa Fe Project (2006)
Franz Liszt
Élégie No. 1 [first/second/third version] S.130 (1874)
Duo in G (1875)
Élégie No. 2 S.131 (1877)
Romance oubliée S.132 (1880)
La lugubre gondola S.134, [first/second version] (1883?, 1885?)
Vasily Lobanov
Sonata No.1 for cello and piano Op. 14 (1971)
7 pieces for cello and piano Op. 25 (1978)
Sonata No.2 for cello and piano Op. 54 (1989)
Pietro Antonio Locatelli
Cello sonata in D major
Alvin Lucier
Twonings (2006)
Witold Lutoslawski
Grave
Mykola Lysenko
La Tristesse (Sorrow)
Ilya Lyzohub
Sonata

M
Bruno Mantovani
Cinq pièces pour Paul Klee (2007)
James MacMillan
Cello Sonata No. 1
 Cello Sonata No. 2 (15 min) (2000)
Leevi Madetoja
 Suite Lyrique
Michio Mamiya
Cello Sonata
5 Finnish Folk Songs (1977)
6 Japanese Folk Songs (1972)
Juan Manén
Sonata di concerto for cello and piano Op. A-42 (1947)
Albéric Magnard
Cello sonata, Op. 20 in A (1911)
Benedetto Marcello
12 sonatas (1730s)
Andrew March
Ephemeral Nymphs, for Cello and Piano (2015)
Frank Martin
Chaconne for Cello and Piano (1931)
Ballade for Cello and Piano (1949)
Bohuslav Martinů
Cello sonata, No. 1 (1939)
Cello sonata, No. 2 (1941)
Cello sonata, No. 3 (1952)
Variations sur un thème Slovaque, H.378
Variations on a Theme of Rossini, H.290
Ariette, H 188B (1930 Paris)
Nocturnes, H 189 (1931 Paris)
Pastorals, H 190 (1931 Paris)
Miniature Suite, H 192 (1931 Paris)
7 Arabesques, H. 201
Zoe Martlew
Berceuse
Giuseppe Martucci
Cello Sonata Op. 52 in F sharp minor (1880)
3 Pieces for Cello and Piano, Op. 69 (1888)
2 Romances for Cello and Piano, Op. 72 (1890)
Joseph Marx
Pastorale (1914)
Suite (1914)
Colin Matthews
Three Enigmas
Five Duos
Usko Meriläinen
Meditation
Paripeli
Felix Mendelssohn
Cello sonata No. 1, Op. 45 in B flat major (1838)
Cello sonata No. 2, Op. 58 in D major (1842–43)
Variations concertantes, Op. 17
Song Without Words in D major, Op. 109
Andante Cantabile from "Sonata No. 3" for Organ (Calamosca)
Krzysztof Meyer
Canzona per violoncello e pianoforte, Op. 56 (1981)
Sonata per violoncello e pianoforte No.1, Op. 62 (1983)
Sonata per violoncello e pianoforte No.2, Op. 99 (2004)
Marcel Mihalovici
Sonata in the character of a lyrical scene, Op. 108
András Mihály
Mouvement for Cello and Piano (1962)
Darius Milhaud
Élégie for cello and piano, Op. 251 (1945)
Sonata for cello and piano, Op. 377 (1959)
Eric Moe (1954–?)
Variations (1985) for cello and piano
Mud Wrestling at the O.K. Corral (2007) for cello and piano
Ernest John Moeran
Cello sonata in A minor (1947)
Ignaz Moscheles
Grande sonate concertante, Op.34 (1814)
Cello Sonata, Op.121 (1850)
Melodic-Contrapuntal Studies, Op. 137 (After Bach's The Well Tempered Clavier)
Alexander Mosolov
Elegy for cello and piano, Op.2
Legend for cello and piano, Op.5 (1924)
Sonata for cello and piano (1927)
Wolfgang Amadeus Mozart
Sonata in G major, K379 for Cello and Piano, transcribed by Alexander Kniazev
Sonata in G major, K301 for Cello and Piano, transcribed by Alexander Kniazev
Sonata in F major, K376 for Cello and Piano, transcribed by Alexander Kniazev
Sonata-Rondo from Mozarts Fragment KV Anh. 46 (374g) for cello and piano 1782 (completed by John Hilliard)
Franz Xaver Wolfgang Mozart
Sonata for violoncello and piano in E major, Op. 19 (published in 1820)
Nikolai Myaskovsky
Cello sonata, Op. 12 in D (1911)
Cello sonata, Op. 81 in A minor (1948–49)

N
Nicolas Nabokov
Prelude, Four Variations and Finale
Luis Naon
Tango del desamparo (1987)
Lior Navok
Fluctuations
Marc Neikrug
Petrus (2001)
Fabio Nieder
Zwei frühe Stücke (1975)
Ichiro Nodaïra
Deux images (1997)
Texture du délire IV (2004)
Per Nørgård
Cantica (1977)
Andrew Norman
Sonnets
Ludvig Norman
Cello Sonata in D major, Op. 28
Jan NovákRotundelli for cello and piano, 1981
Vítězslav Novák
Cello sonata, Op. 66 in G minor

O
Maurice Ohana
Noctuaire
Syrtes
Samir Odeh-Tamimi
Jabsurr (2009)
Georg Onslow
Cello Sonata, Op.16 No.1
Cello Sonata, Op.16 No.2
Cello Sonata, Op.16 No.3
Peter van Onna
Geographies: Kyoto Anmintaku, for Cello and Piano
Leo Ornstein
Six Preludes
Two pieces Op. 33
Cello Sonata No.1, Op. 52 (1918)
Cello Sonata No.2 (1920)
Composition I
Charles Wilfred OrrCarmen Fantasy for cello and piano
Pablo Ortiz
Mid-century (2019)

P
Paul Paray
Cello Sonata (1921)
Hubert Parry
Cello sonata in A (1879)
Thierry Pécou
Traversée du rêve (1988)
Suite aquatique (1994)
Soleil-Tigre
Dora Pejačević
Sonata for Cello and Piano in E minor Op. 35 (1913)
George Perle
Lyric Piece (1946)
Sonata (1985)
Vincent Persichetti
Vocalise, op.27 (1945)
Wayne PetersonRhapsody for Cello and Piano (1976)
Hans Pfitzner
Cello sonata, Op. 1 in F-sharp minor
Carlo Alfredo PiattiAir Baskyrs, Op. 8Am Meer, Serenade, Ave Maria (Franz Schubert / Alfredo Piatti)Canto di primavera for cello and pianoCanzonetta for cello and pianoDanza moresca for cello and pianoElegia per la morte di Cavour for cello and pianoEntreaty / Supplication / Bitte for cello and pianoFollia su un’aria di Geminiani for cello and pianoGagliarda for cello and pianoImpromptu sopra un’aria di Purcell nella “Regina Indiana for cello and pianoIntroduction and Variations on a theme from Donizetti's Lucia di Lammermoor, Op. 2 for cello and pianoIntroduzione e Allegro alla Spagnuola for cello and pianoLa Bergamasca, Op. 14 for cello and pianoGita in gondola / La Danza for cello and pianoLes Fiancés, Op. 7 for cello and pianoMazurka Sentimentale, Op. 6 for cello and pianoNotturno, Op. 20 for cello and pianoOssian's song, Ballad for cello and pianoPassetemps Sentimental, Op. 4Pioggia d’Aprile for cello and pianoSérénade Italienne, Op. 17 for cello and pianoSiciliana, Op. 19 for cello and pianoSouvenir de la Sonnambula, Op. 5 for cello and pianoTarantella, Op. 23 for cello and pianoTema e Variazioni for cello and pianoThe race – La corsa for cello and piano
Ástor Piazzolla
Tres piezas BrevesLe Grand Tango for cello and piano
Gabriel Pierné
Cello sonata, Op. 46 in F-sharp minor (1919) 
Willem Pijper
Cello sonata, No. 1 (1919)
Cello sonata, No. 2 (1924)
Matthias Pintscher
Uriel (2011-2012)
Walter Piston
Duo for Cello and Piano (1972)
Ildebrando Pizzetti
Cello sonata in F (1921)
Manuel Ponce
 Sonata for cello and piano (1922)
Miroslav Ponc
Five short pieces Op. 9 (1927)
Enno Poppe
Schweiss (2010)
David Popper
Op. 3, Scenes From a Masked Ball, cello and piano
Op. 5, Romance, cello and piano
Op. 10, Pieces for cello and piano
Op. 11, Pieces for cello and piano
Op. 12, Mazurka in D minor, cello and piano
Op. 14, Polonaise de concert, cello and piano
Op. 18, Sérénade orientale, cello and piano
Op. 22, Nocturne in G major, cello and piano
Op. 23, Pieces for cello and piano
Op. 28, Concert-Polonaise No. 2 in F major, cello and piano
Op. 32, Pieces for cello and piano
Op. 33, Tarantella, cello and piano
Op. 35, Four Mazurkas, cello and piano
Op. 38, Barcarolle in G major, cello and piano
Op. 39, Dance of the Elves, cello and piano
Op. 41, Nocturne, cello and piano
Op. 42, Three Nocturnes, cello and piano
Op. 43, Fantasy on Little Russian Songs, cello and piano
Op. 46, 2 Transcriptions for Cello and Piano
Op. 47, Nocturne No.4 in B Minor for cello and piano
Op. 48, Menuetto in D major, cello and piano
Op. 51, Six Mazurkas, cello and piano
Op. 54, Spanish Dances, cello and piano
Op. 55, Pieces for cello and piano
Op. 60, Walzer Suite, cello and piano
Op. 62, Pieces for cello and piano
Op. 64, Pieces for cello and piano
Op. 65, Pieces for cello and piano
Op. 67, Pieces for cello and piano
Op. 68, Hungarian Rhapsody, cello and piano
Op. 69, Suite for cello and piano
Op. 71, Scottish Fantasy, cello and piano
Op. 75, Serenade, cello and piano
Op. 81, Gavotte in A Major for Cello and Piano
Alberto Posadas
Proemio (2011)
Francis Poulenc
Cello sonata (1948)
Henri Pousseur
Petit Mausolee ambulant (2005)
Nikolai Potolovsky
Cello Sonata Op.2 (1905)
Gerhard PräsentSonata al dente for cello and piano op.23 (1988–90)
Sergei Prokofiev
Ballade for Cello and Piano Op 15 (1912)
Cello sonata, Op. 119 (1949)

R
Sergei Rachmaninoff
Cello Sonata in G minor, Op. 19 (1901)
Horatiu Radulescu
L'exil Intérieur 1997
Joachim Raff
Cello Sonata in D, Op. 183 (1873)
Einojuhani Rautavaara
2 Preludes & Fugues (1955)
Music for Upright Piano and Amplified Cello (1977)
Sonata for Cello and Piano (1974/1991)
Cello Sonata No. 2
Polska (Polka)
Sydämeni laulu / Song of My Heart (2000)
Matti Rautio
Divertimento 1
Divertimento 2
Max Reger
Cello sonata, Op. 5 in F minor (1892)
Cello sonata, Op. 28 in G minor (1898?)
Cello sonata, Op. 78 in F (1904)
Cello sonata, Op. 116 in A minor (1910?)
Two pieces for cello and piano, Op. 79e (1904)
Aribert Reimann
Cello Sonata (1965)
Carl Reinecke
Cello sonata, Op. 42 in A minor (1847/8)
Cello sonata, Op. 89 in D (1866)
Drei stücke, Op. 146 (1878)
Cello sonata, Op. 238 in G
Roger Reynolds
A Crimson Path (2000)
Josef Rheinberger
Cello sonata, Op. 92 in C
Ferdinand Ries
Cello sonata, WoO. 2 in C minor
Cello sonata, Op. 20 in C
Cello sonata, Op. 21 in A
Cello sonata, Op. 125 in G minor
Wolfgang Rihm
Von weit (1993)
Yann Robin
Con Fuoco (2011)
Julius Röntgen
Cello Sonata No. 1 in B-flat, Op. 3 (1872–73)
Cello Sonata No. 2 in A minor, Op. 41 (1900)
Cello Sonata No. 3 in G minor (1905)
Cello Sonata No. 4 in C minor (1906)
Cello Sonata No. 5 in B minor, Op. 56 (1907–10)
Cello Sonata No. 6 in D (1914–15)
Cello Sonata No. 7 in F-sharp minor (1917)
Cello Sonata No. 8 in D minor (1926)
Cello Sonata No. 9 in E minor (1927)
Cello Sonata No. 10 in C minor (1927)
Cello Sonata No. 11 in D minor (1930)
Cello Sonata No. 12 in A minor (1930)
Cello Sonata No. 13 in C-sharp minor (1931)
Cello Sonata No. 14 in C major (1931)
and many variation sets and other works (source )
Joseph Guy Ropartz
Cello sonata, Op. 119 in G minor
Cello sonata in A minor
Nikolai Roslavets
Dance of the White Girls (1912)
Meditation (1921)
Sonata No. 1 (1921) — published 1924
Sonata No. 2 (1921–1922) 
Miklós Rózsa
Duo, Op. 8 (about 1931)
Edmund Rubbra
Cello sonata, Op. 60 in G minor (1946)
Anton Rubinstein
Cello sonata, Op. 18 in D (1852)
Cello sonata, Op. 39 in G (1857)
Joseph Ryelandt
Cello Sonata No. 1, Op. 22 (1898)
Cello Sonata No. 2, Op. 66 (1917)
Cello Sonata No. 3, Op. 132 (1944) 

S
Kaija Saariaho
Im Traume (1980)
Camille Saint-Saëns
Suite for Cello and Piano, Op. 16 (1866)
Cello sonata, Op. 32 in C minor (1872–73)
Allegro Appassionato Op.43
Romance Op.67
Chant Saphique Op.91
Cello sonata, Op. 123 in F (1905)
Priére Op.158
Gavotte Op. posth.
Aulis Sallinen
Metamorfora (1974)
Cello Sonata Op.86 (2004)
Baumgesang mit Epilog
Timothy SalterCantus for cello and piano (1975)
Georgina Sánchez Torres
Elegía Rapsódica
En la Holgura de la abstrusa noche
Hirundo Rustica
La Ciudad del Cielo
El Sollozar del Guerrero
Cuando los rescoldos se volvieron llamas
El Eslabón del afecto eterno
Giacinto Scelsi
Dialogo for cello and piano (1932)
Ballata for cello and piano (1943)
To the master "Two improvisations" for cello and piano (1974)
Philipp Scharwenka
Cello Sonata in G minor (op. 116)
Xaver Scharwenka
Cello Sonata in E minor (op. 46) (1877) (score available at IMSLP)
Rodion Shchedrin
Quadrille (from opera Not Love Alone)
Sonata (1996)
Ancient Melodies of Russian Folk Songs (2007)
Alexander ShchetynskyAntiphons for Cello and Piano (1983)
Message from A.W. for Cello and Piano (1996)
Sonata for Cello and Piano (2006)
Franz Schmidt
Drei Kleine Fantasiestücke (1892)
Alfred Schnittke
Cello sonata, No. 1 (1978)
Cello sonata, No. 2 (1993–94)
Ruth Schonthal
Sonata concertante: for cello, viola or clarinet and piano (1973)
Franz Schubert
Sonata for the Arpeggione D.821 in A minorFantasy in F minor, D.940, orig. piano four-hands (Varga)
Robert Schumann
Adagio und Allegro, Op. 70 (originally for horn and piano)
Fantasiestücke, Op.73 (originally for clarinet and piano)Fünf Stücke im Volkston (Five Pieces in Folk Style), Op.102
Camillo Schumann
Cellosonate Nr. 1 op. 59
Cellosonate Nr. 2 op. 99 
Cellosonate Nr. 3 op. 118a
Erwin Schulhoff
Cello sonata
Vissarion Shebalin
Cello sonata in C
Salvatore Sciarrino
Melencolia I
Matyas Seiber
Phantasy (1944)
Bright Sheng
Northern Lights (2009)
Dmitri Shostakovich
Cello sonata, Op. 40 in D minor (1934)
Andriy Shtoharenko
Sonata for cello and piano
Jean Sibelius
Malinconia Op.20 (1900)
Cantique & Devotion op.77 (1915)
Four Pieces Op. 78 (1915-17)
Valentin Silvestrov
Sonata
Hans Sitt
Romanze Op. 17
Scherzo Op.35
Fredrik Sixten
Sonata for cello and piano (1986)
Epilogue for cello and piano (2002)
Emil Sjögren
Cello sonata in A major, Op. 58 (1912)
Nikos Skalkottas
Largo for cello and piano (c. 1940)
Sonatina for cello and piano (1949)
Bolero for cello and piano (1948–9)
Tender Melody for cello and piano (1948–9)
Serenata for cello and piano (1948–9)
Tender Melody for cello and piano (1948–9)
Dave Smith
Kaivopuisto (1996)
David Stanley Smith
Cello sonata, Op. 59
Ethel Smyth
Cello Sonata No. 1 in C minor (1880)
Cello Sonata No. 2 in A minor, Op. 5 (1887)
Charles Villiers Stanford
Cello Sonata, No. 1, Op. 9 in A major (1877)
Cello Sonata, No. 2, Op. 39 in D minor (1889) ( (Hyperion Records gives 1893 for their recording of the same work however.))
Zygmunt Stojowski
Cello Sonata, Op. 18 in A (1894)
Richard Strauss
Cello Sonata, Op. 6 in F (1883)
Romance
Rita Strohl
Great Dramatic Sonata, "Titus et Bérénice" (published 1898)
Josef Suk
Ballade and Serenade Op. 3
Stjepan Šulek
Cello Sonata (1974)

T
Alexander Taneyev
Bagatelle and Serenade for cello and piano, Op.10
Alexander Tansman
Partita
Deux Pièces
Fantaisie
Sonata for cello and piano
Quatre Pièces Faciles
Toru Takemitsu
Orion (1984)
Otar Taktakishvili
Poem and Allegro for cello and piano (1969)
Jan Tausinger
Suite-sonata for cello and piano (1974–75)
Boris Tchaikovsky
Cello sonata in E minor (1957)
Alexander Tcherepnin
Ode für Violoncello und Klavier
Sonata No. 1 for cello and piano Op.29 (1924).
Sonata No. 2 for cello and piano Op.30 No.1 (1924)
Sonata No. 3 for cello and piano Op.30 No.2 (1919–26)
Mystère op. 37 Nr.2 
12 Preludes (Violoncelle bien tempéré)Op.38 (1925–26)
Songs and dances op. 84 (1953)
Mikis Theodorakis
East of the Aegean, Suite for cello and piano
Augusta Read Thomas
Chant, for cello and piano (1991; revised 2002)
Cantos for Slava (2007)
Bebop Riddle II (2022)
Virgil Thomson
Four Portraits, for cello and piano (arranged in 1942 by Luigi Silva)
Ludwig Thuille
Cello Sonata in D minor, Op. 22 (1902)
Ernst Toch
Cello sonata, Op. 50 (1929)
Variations for cello and piano (2004)
Donald Tovey
Cello sonata, Op. 4 in F (before 1911)
Elegiac Variations for cello and piano, Op. 25 (1909)
Mark-Anthony TurnageSleep on... for cello and piano (1992)
Two Vocalises
Joan Tower
Très lent (Hommage à Messiaen) (1994)
Jovanka Trbojevic
La Dolce Vita (2012)
This is my second life (2013)
Arnold Trowell
Cello Sonata No.2, Op. 30 (1915)
Sulkhan Tsintsadze
 Five Pieces on Folk Themes for cello and piano
 Georgian Melodies for cello and piano (1967) (26 min)
 Twenty-Four Preludes for cello and piano (1980)

U
Galina Ustvolskaya
Grand Duet (1959)

V
Moisei Vainberg see Mieczysław Weinberg
Antonio Vandini
Two Sonatas in F major and G major
Giuseppe Valentini
Sonata in E major
Ralph Vaughan Williams
Six Studies in English Folksong (1926)
Sándor Veress
Sonatina per violoncello e pianoforte(1933)
Matthijs Vermeulen
Two cello sonatas (1918, 1938)
Louis Vierne
Cello sonata, Op. 27 in B minor (1910)
Heitor Villa-Lobos
Pequena Suite (1913)Capriccio Op. 49 (1914)
Elegia (1916)
Cello sonata, No. 1 (score missing)
Cello sonata, No. 2, Op. 66, 1916
 Song of the Black Swan (1917)
Divagacao (1946)
Pequena Sonata
Antonio Vivaldi
at least nine sonatas
Claude Vivier
Pièce pour violoncelle et piano

W
Errollyn Wallen
Dervish
Huw Watkins
Sonata (2000)
Blue Shadows Fall (2013)
Franz WaxmanCarmen Fantasy based on themes from the Bizet Opera (arr. David Grigorian )
Anton Webern
Two Pieces (1899)
Cello sonata (1913)
Three Little Pieces for cello and piano, Op. 11 (1914)
Karl Weigl
Cello Sonata (1923)
Two Pieces for cello and piano (1940)
Menuetto for cello and piano (1948)
Kurt Weill
Cello sonata
Mieczysław Weinberg
Cello sonata, Op. 21 in C (1945)
Cello sonata, Op. 63 in G minor (1958–59)
Leo Weiner
Romance for Cello and Piano Op.14 (1949)
Felix Weingartner
Cello Sonata (1892)
Charles-Marie Widor
Cello sonata, Op. 80 in A (1907)
Adrian WilliamsSpring Requiem for cello and piano (15 min) (1993)4 Cantilenes for cello and pianoImages of a Mind (16 min) (1986)
Richard Wilson
Motivations for cello and piano (2000)
Charles WuorinenDuuiensela (1962)Adapting to the Times (1969)Fast Fantasy (1977)An Orbicle of Jasp (1999)Andante Espressivo'' (2001)
Josef Wölfl
Duet Op. 31 (1805)

X
Iannis Xenakis
Paille in the wind

Y
Joji Yuasa
Projection
Cosmos Haptic IV
Isang Yun
Nore (1964)
Intermezzo (1988)
Espace I (1992)

Z
Alexander von Zemlinsky
 3 pieces (1891)
Cello sonata in A minor (1894)
Edson Zampronha
Between the Thunder and the Echo (premiered 2011)
Bernd Alois Zimmermann
Intercommunicazione (1967)
Ellen Taaffe Zwilich
Lament for cello and piano (2000)

See also
Cello sonata
String instrument repertoire
List of solo cello pieces
List of compositions for cello and orchestra
List of compositions for cello and organ
Double Concerto for Violin and Cello
Triple Concerto for Violin Cello and Piano

References

External links
Repertoire for Solo Cello
Some Composers of Cello Works 

 
Cello and piano